The Central District of Oshnavieh County is in West Azerbaijan province, Iran. At the National Census in 2006, its population was 48,482 in 10,263 households. The following census in 2011 counted 54,023 people in 13,698 households. At the latest census in 2016, the district had 57,628 inhabitants in 15,217 households.

References 

Oshnavieh County

Districts of West Azerbaijan Province

Populated places in West Azerbaijan Province

Populated places in Oshnavieh County